Arenal Volcano is an active andesitic stratovolcano in north-western Costa Rica around  northwest of San José, in the province of Alajuela, canton of San Carlos, and district of La Fortuna. It is conically shaped with a crater  in diameter. Geologically, Arenal is considered a young volcano and it is estimated to be less than 7,500 years old. It is also known as "Pan de Azúcar", "Canaste", "Volcan Costa Rica", "Volcan Río Frío" or "Guatusos Peak".

The volcano was dormant for hundreds of years and exhibited 2 craters at its summit, with minor fumaroles activity, covered by dense vegetation. In 1968 it erupted unexpectedly, destroying the small town of Tabacón. Due to the eruption three more craters were created on the western flanks but only one of them still exists today. Arenal's eruption from 1968 to 2010 is the tenth longest duration volcanic eruption on Earth since 1750. Since 2010, Arenal has been dormant.

Geographic setting and description
Arenal is one of seven historically active Costa Rican volcanoes along with Poás, Irazú, Miravalles, Orosí, Rincón de la Vieja complex, and Turrialba. It was Costa Rica's most active volcano until 2010, and one of the ten most active volcanoes in the world. It has been studied by seismologists for many years.

Arenal Volcano area is an important watershed for the Arenal Lake Reservoir. The reservoir's water is used for hydroelectric power. It is also connected to the national system.

Arenal has several eruptive vents. Chato is a dormant stratovolcanic cone. It is believed that Chato first erupted 38,000 years ago during the Pleistocene period and last erupted about 3,500 years ago. Espina is another lava dome.

Geologic history
Arenal is the youngest and most active of all the volcanoes in Costa Rica. Scientists have been able to date its activity back more than 7000 years. The area remained largely unexplored until 1937, when a documented expedition took place to reach the summit. It has been considered eruptive since 1968.

July 29, 1968

On Monday, July 29, 1968, at 7:30 am, the Arenal Volcano suddenly and violently erupted. The eruptions continued unabated for several days, burying over  under rocks, lava and ash. Crops were spoiled, property was ruined, and large numbers of livestock were killed.

At the height of its ferocious activity, the volcano flung giant rocks – some weighing several tons – more than a kilometer (half a mile) away at a rate of .These explosions would go on to form three new active craters.

As the three towns were destroyed on the western side of the volcano, a town by the name of El Borio on the east side was untouched and unharmed. It is a popular myth that after the volcano ceased to erupt, El Borio was renamed La Fortuna, which means "the fortunate", referring to its luckiness that the volcano erupted to the west and not the east.  However, the town was renamed La Fortuna by its residents before the 1968 eruption. "The Fortune" refers to the flat, fertile lands in the area, which are unlike the rough, mountainous terrain which surrounds most of the Arenal volcano.  If the town had been renamed "The Fortunate", it would have been called "El Afortunado."

June 1975
Between the 17th and the 21st of June 1975 several avalanches went down from one of the craters. The vegetation along Tabacon River was destroyed and a great amount of material was deposited on the riverbed. Four strong explosions also blew large amounts of ash into the sky.

March 1996
At this time the volcano started to produce regular lava flows, accompanied by intermittent explosions of gases. This was the regular activity of the volcano until May 5, 1998.

May 5, 1998
The Arenal Volcano experienced a series of large eruptions on Tuesday afternoon, May 5, 1998. The first ratchet eruption was recorded at 1:05 p.m. when part of the northwest wall of the crater fell apart. Large amounts of lava, rocks, and ash flew out of the volcano during this explosion. Another eruption took place at 2:20 p.m. with material emerging from the same part of the volcano.

A specialist from the Costa Rica Volcanic and Seismic Observatory explained that the eruptions are nothing unusual for the volcano. Nevertheless, during this occasion, the amount of lava within the crater was significantly greater than normal and therefore more material was poured out. This time a landslide took place, too, as a part of the crater wall falling apart on the northwest side. This phenomenon occurs sporadically, although this time the consequences were greater than usual.

As a normal precaution, authorities declared a red alert, closed the road between La Fortuna and Tilarán, which runs around the north side of the volcano, and evacuated approximately 450 people (mostly tourists) from the immediate area, including several hotels and tourism-oriented businesses. There were no reports of injuries caused by the volcanic activity.

At 5:20 p.m. on Tuesday the volcano was still discharging material, but activity had decreased significantly.

May 7, 1998
The eruptions of May 7, 1998, damaged  and destroyed a  area of green forest in the vicinity of Arenal Volcano.

During this day 23 eruptions were reported, between 1:05 p.m. and 7:00 p.m., and thereafter the volcano returned to its normal state. Authorities reported no unusual behavior and the national park was reopened the same week. Local seismologists investigate the activity of the volcano and park rangers continue to vigorously enforce the safety perimeter.

See also
 List of volcanoes in Costa Rica
 Lake Arenal
 Arenal Volcano National Park
 Arenal Prehistory Project

References

External links

 MTU Volcanoes Page: Arenal
 Updated (and detailed) information and images about Arenal and its recent activity
 Most recent pictures of Arenal eruptions
 Jorque Barquero's Personal Account of the 1968 Eruption
 

Active volcanoes
Stratovolcanoes of Costa Rica
Subduction volcanoes
Mountains of Costa Rica
Geography of Alajuela Province
Holocene stratovolcanoes